Lionel de Jersey Harvard (3 June 1893 – 30 March 1918) was a young Englishman who, discovered to be collaterally descended from Harvard College
founder
John Harvard, was consequently offered the opportunity to attend that university, from which he graduated in 1915.
The first Harvard to attend Harvard, he died in the First World War less than three years later, leaving a wife and infant son.

After his death a fellow officer wrote, "If Harvard College made him what he was, I want my sons to go there that it may do the same for them."
Harvard's Lionel Hall, and its Lionel deJersey Harvard Scholarship, are named in his honour.

Background

In 1908 editor Mark A. De Wolfe Howe discovered an 1847 letter
in which Harvard President Edward Everett makes reference to a "Reverend John Harvard" living at the time in Plymouth, England, calling him "a Wesleyan clergyman whose ancestor... was a brother of our founder".
Inquiries led to the identification of London businessman
Thomas Mawson Harvard as the youngest son of this nineteenth-century Reverend John Harvard (18191888),
through whom he was descended from Thomas Harvard (1609–1637), brother
of Harvard University founder John Harvard (1607–1638), who had died childless.

Thomas Mawson Harvard's elder son Lionel deJersey Harvard (called "Leo" by his family) 
was at the time attending St Olave's and St Saviour's Grammar School in Southwarkthe successor to St Saviour's Grammar School, which John Harvard had himself attended.
Also like John Harvard, many in Lionel's line had attended Emmanuel College, Cambridge and become ministers.
On his leaving St Olave's, however, the family's finances ruled out any ambition to attend Emmanuel College himself, and so he took employment with a firm of marine insurance brokers.

In 1910 a group of Harvard alumni offered to underwrite Lionel's attendance at Harvard College,
which itself waived the tuition of $150 per year.
He failed his first attempt at the entrance exam, but after a year of refresher study he qualified, and "set out for Cambridge, Massachusetts in lieu of Cambridge, England", as his friend John Paulding Brown put it later.

Harvard College

The "sentimental and romantic"
story of "how Mother Harvard sought and found one of her own"
was reported throughout the United States,
and on 26September 1911 the Boston Transcript announced, "Harvard of Harvard Here".
"He had the time of his life getting safely ashore [past] reporters and camera artists", said The Cambridge Tribune. "Apparently the one thing he does not wish is notoriety of any kind."
Howe later wrote that "it seemed like the realization of a fairy-tale... Our local newspapers did everything in their power to spoil him, if he had been spoilable. His arrival and history were glaringly chronicled."
His freshman rooms were in Weld Hall.

He was a good student if not brilliant, and one of the most popular members of his class;
Brown called him "a little different from the boys who come up each year as Freshmen, more gentle, perhaps, and more self-controlled."
He belonged to the Hasty Pudding and D.U. Clubs, Delta Kappa Epsilon, the Signet Society, the Glee Club, the Dramatic, Musical and Cosmopolitan Clubs, the Social Service Committee of Phillips Brooks House, the Chapel Choir, the Memorial Society, and the Christian Association; and was an officer of several of these.
Though on arrival he had told reporters that he played soccer and tennis, and wanted to learn baseball and American football,
his participation in organized athletics was limited to class crew.

His junior-year recitation of Alfred Noyes' "The Highwayman" won him the Boylston Prize,
and after he portrayed John Harvard in a pageant celebrating the 150th anniversary of Hollis Hall
his classmates began calling him John.
"Great was the applause whenever the  broke into, 'Here's to Johnny Harvard, fill him up a glass, Fill him up a glass to his name and fame,' for there he was in person. [He] seemed a living symbol of all that was best and brightest in Harvard itself, manifested to us briefly after three hundred years."

Commencement

Graduating cum laude in English
in June 1915, he was selected to compose both the Class Poem and the Baccalaurete Hymn.
His poem was "a stirring lyric adjuring all Harvard men in the present crisis of civilization [i.e. World War I] to stand for their historic ideals of freedom":

His hymn reflected similar themes:

Speaking to the Alumni Association immediately after receiving his diploma he said, "I have had four years here full to the brim of happiness and ever-increasing joy... I can never say enough in gratitude. When I say 'Thank you!' that word was never charged with more fervor." 
He later wrote to Howe: "I have never been able to find out who were the gentlemen who have been so generously looking after me in money matters whilst I have been in Cambridge. It has been awfully generous of them, and I do appreciate it. I hope I shall be able to repay the kindness of you all in many more ways than one."

Army, marriage, and death

Harvard planned to become a medical missionary, but on returning to London immediately after graduation he enlisted in the British Army. "It is all of a piece with the devotion which the best young men of Europe are rendering to their flags," said the Harvard Alumni Bulletin. He joined the Inns of Court Officers' Training Corps on 12 July 1915 and was commissioned a second lieutenant in the Grenadier Guards on 28 September. He was promoted to lieutenant in January 1916 and joined the 1st Battalion in France on 8March 1916.

On 11 September 1915 he married childhood friend (Edith) May Barker,
to whom he had been quietly engaged since before leaving for America. A son, John Peter deJersey Harvard,
was born 4September 1916.
Lionel was shot in the chest on 25 September 1916 at Lesboeufs during the Battle of the Somme
but after a long convalescence he returned to combat in June 1917, as company commander.

At the outbreak of the war, Lionel's younger brother Kenneth O'Gorman Harvard (born 4June 1897)
gave up his intention to attend Harvard College. He was commissioned August 1915 and, with Lionel, was promoted to lieutenant in the Grenadier Guards in January 1916. He was killed at Pilckem Ridge, during the Battle of Passchendaele, on 1August 1917; Lionel, who had been fighting nearby, helped bury him.

By March 1918 Lionel Harvard was commander of Number One Company, designated the King's Companyas Brown put it, "a high honor for a lieutenant, and usually a fatal one". On the morning of 30March 1918 he was killed by a minenwerfer shell
near Arras during the German spring offensive, just before a promotion to captain became effective. He was buried at Boisleux-au-Mont.

Tributes and legacy

In 1919 poet Harry Webb Farrington published a hymn, "Lionel de Jersey Harvard", including the lines:

Harvard President Abbott Lawrence Lowell called Lionel Harvard's death "a great personal loss", noting that Lionel, like John Harvard, died just three years after taking his degree;
Lowell's personal gift of $110,000 built Lionel Hall (1925) as a memorial.
In his 1923 Commencement address, Lowell related a letter written by a British officer seeking advice on preparing his sons for Harvard College. In Lowell's telling, this officer explained that near the end of the war, he had

Lionel and Kenneth were remembered on the memorial at their first school, Malvern House School, Lewisham Park (destroyed in an air raid during World War II) and on a memorial at the Wesleyan Church (now demolished)
at Sydenham.
In 1923 the Associated Harvard Clubs established the Lionel de Jersey Harvard Scholarship,
which annually funds a year's study at Emmanuel College by a Harvard College graduate.

There was discussion of arranging for Lionel's son John Peter to follow his father to Harvard,
but after he attended the school's tercentenary celebration as a guest in September 1936, Time reported that he would likely continue his education in England.
As a major in the Royal Artillery during World War II he survived imprisonment by the Japanese after being captured in the Battle of Singapore.

A second Harvard, John Harvard of Andes, New York, graduated cum laude from Harvard College in 1969.

Notes

References

External links

 

1893 births
1918 deaths
People educated at St Olave's Grammar School
English expatriates in the United States
Harvard University alumni
British Army personnel of World War I
British military personnel killed in World War I
Grenadier Guards officers
Burials in Commonwealth War Graves Commission cemeteries in France